Botia (Indian loaches) is a genus of freshwater fish in the loach family (Botiidae). It was a large genus with about 20 species. In 2004 Maurice Kottelat proposed in his paper (along with the description of Botia kubotai, see References below) to divide the genus into four related genera based on fish appearance and locality:

 Botia for Indian loaches (shorter body).
 Chromobotia for clown loach.
 Syncrossus for tiger loaches (elongated body).
 Yasuhikotakia for Mekong loaches (shorter body).

Another genus, Parabotia, was considered a separate genus earlier.  It has an elongated body quite similar to Syncrossus,  but with its range mostly restricted to China. With all these as separate genera, Botia species are restricted to South Asia (including Burma).

The fish in these genera possess a pair of razor-sharp spines under their eye sockets. These spines normally lie flat, but may be extended when the loach feels threatened. This behavior is rarely observed when the fish is swimming, but care must be taken when catching botia in fishnets — the projecting spines may become entangled, causing injury to the fish and/or damage to the net.  Care must also be taken when transporting the larger botia, as their subocular spines may puncture the enclosing polyethylene bags that are normally used for this purpose.

One special characteristic of this loach group is the ability to produce a loud "clicking" noise, which is commonly heard during feeding time. This noise stems from a special type of pharyngeal teeth that are used to extract snails from their shells. For aquarists, this gives the botia a practical application, as they can be used to fight a snail infestation.

Another peculiarity of botia is that they are often seen resting on their side or in other strange positions.  While this can be normal, healthy behaviour for botia, it is rarely observed in other types of fish.  The unusual habit often causes needless panic for the inexperienced aquarist, who mistakenly assumes their fish is ill.

Species
There are currently nine recognized species in this genus:

References 

 Turner, Emma. 2007. "An Introduction To Keeping Botia" Loaches Online 
 Kottelat, M. 2004. Botia kubotai, a new species of loach (Teleostei: Cobitidae) from the Ataran River basin (Myanmar), with comments on botiine nomenclature and diagnosis of a new genus. Zootaxa, 401: 1-18.
 "Botia." ITIS Standard Report. (Integrated Taxonomic Information System: National Museum of Natural History, Washington, D.C., 2004-10-11). ITIS 638919
 Ophir, M. 2009. "Keeping Loaches in Home Aquaria: General Tips and Recommendations". www.loachworld.com 

Botiidae
Freshwater fish genera
Taxa named by John Edward Gray